Joseph Gregory Hursley (born March 19, 1979) is an actor and musician living in Los Angeles, California.

Early life
Hursley was born in Austin, Texas. His great-grandfather is Frank M. Hursley, co-creator of General Hospital, the longest running television soap opera. His father, Greg Hursley, is an architectural photographer and his mother Kelle is a nurse.

Hursley began his entertainment career after participating in the Schick "Groove n' Smooth" national talent search in 1999. He won the talent search, and started a karaoke company at age 19. He became well known in Austin nightlife scene as Karaoke Joe, going on to perform over five-hundred shows the next few years.

Career
Hursley's first big break in the entertainment business was being tapped by Ashton Kutcher to star in the 2004 MTV reality comedy series You've Got a Friend. His task was to play an obnoxious 'friend' for 48 hours, while contestants had to prove their friendship in front of real friends and loved ones for a prize of $15,000. Hursley was increasingly sinister as the series progressed. After the show, Hursley joined Kutcher on Punk'd, where he pranked various celebrities.

He then appeared in major films including Accepted, Resident Evil: Extinction and Fast & Furious, which led him to his first starring feature role with cult director Penelope Spheeris in Balls to the Wall (2011).

In 2009 Hursley starred in the rock opera Battle for Milkquarious, a promotional short film released by the California Milk Processor Board, creators of the "Got Milk?" campaign. Hursley played the film's protagonist, "Milktastic Rock Star" White Gold.

Hursley appeared in the 2013 action/fantasy/horror short "Sequence", which was internationally recognized at festivals worldwide, which included a nod for Best Actor (Short Shorts Film Festival Japan 2014), and winning overall Best Short at the LA Shorts Fest (2013).

In The Origins of Wit and Humor he played Les Candalero, a Woody Allen-esque outsider. In the upcoming indie feature "For All Eyes Always", he plays Thomas Devlin, a CIA operative starring in a government sanctioned reality TV show for the American public.

Music
In late 2004, Hursley started the Los Angeles-based rock and roll band and Sunset Strip staples, The Ringers, with whom he released the albums "Tokyo Massage III" and "Headlocks and Highkicks". They appeared in the Miami Ink episode "Ruthless and Toothless". The Ringers were featured in SPIN magazine in 2007. They also performed on stage in Accepted and were the only unsigned band to be featured on the movie soundtrack.

After The Ringers broke up in 2010, Joe and his cousin Patrick Hursley (the drummer of The Ringers) formed the indie rock band Indians. They released their self-titled debut in 2011. The first music video, "Sink Into You", was written and directed by Jordan Albertsen, and starred Joslyn Jensen and Taylor Handley.

Music by the Indians was featured in the 2012 film Rites of Passage, and the television shows Top Gear, and MTV's Catfish.

In 2013 Indians changed their name to We Were Indians, and released their debut album that same year.

Filmography

References

External links

Joe Hursley Official Site
Sink Into You Music Video/Short Film by Indians
We Were Indians band site 

1979 births
Male actors from Los Angeles
American male film actors
American male television actors
Living people
Male actors from Austin, Texas
Musicians from Austin, Texas